The 1901 Cornell Big Red football team was an American football team that represented Cornell University during the 1901 college football season.  In its first season under head coach Raymond Starbuck, the team compiled an 11–1 record, shut out 10 of 12 opponents, and outscored all opponents by a combined total of 333 to 14. The only loss was by an 8–6 score against Princeton.

Five Cornell players received honors on the 1901 College Football All-America Team: guards Bill Warner (Walter Camp-1) and Sanford Hunt (Camp-2, Caspar Whitney-1); quarterback Alfred A. Brewster, Jr. (Whitney-2); halfback Henry Purcell (Camp-2); and fullback Henry Schoellkopf (Camp-3).

Schedule

References

Cornell
Cornell Big Red football seasons
Cornell Big Red football